Vicki Pettersson is an American author known for her Signs of the Zodiac urban fantasy series and Celestial Blues trilogy, both set in modern-day Las Vegas. The Zodiac series follows casino heiress Joanna Archer, who discovers on her 25th birthday that she has superpowers. The Celestial Blues features a P.I. angel and a rockabilly reporter who join forces to fight crime in a noir/paranormal hybrid fiction. As of 2013, she is actively writing straight thrillers.

Biography
Pettersson was born and raised in Las Vegas, Nevada and was a showgirl for "Les Folies Bergere" for 10 years at the Tropicana before giving up show business to be a mother and author.

Pettersson chose Las Vegas as the setting for her Zodiac series because she says, "it's the best possible place in the world for strange characters, and because I know it well."

Bibliography

Novels
Sign of the Zodiac Series
 The Scent of Shadows: The First Sign of the Zodiac (March 2007)
 The Taste of Night: The Second Sign of the Zodiac (April 2007)
 The Touch of Twilight: The Third Sign of the Zodiac (May 2008)
 City of Souls: The Fourth Sign of the Zodiac (June 2009)
 Cheat the Grave: The Fifth Sign of the Zodiac (May 2010)
 Neon Graveyard:  The Sixth Sign of the Zodiac (May 2011)

Celestial Blues Trilogy
 The Taken: Celestial Blues Book One (June 2012)
 The Lost: Celestial Blues Book Two (March 2013)
 The Given: Celestial Blues Book Three (May 2014)

Standalone novels
 Swerve: A Thriller (July 2015)

Anthologies and collections

References

External links
 Official website

1971 births
Living people
21st-century American novelists
American fantasy writers
American women short story writers
American women novelists
Writers from Las Vegas
University of Nevada, Las Vegas alumni
Women science fiction and fantasy writers
21st-century American women writers
21st-century American short story writers